Maxim Igorevich Belkov (born 9 January 1985) is a Russian former professional road cyclist, who rode professionally between 2009 and 2018 for the ,  and  squads.

Major results

2004
 2nd Overall Giro delle Regioni
 7th Gran Premio Palio del Recioto
2005
 1st  Time trial, National Road Championships
 UEC European Under-23 Road Championships
6th Road race
8th Time trial
2006
 1st  Road race, National Under-23 Road Championships
 1st Trofeo Città di San Vendemiano
 2nd Overall Giro delle Regioni
 3rd Time trial, National Road Championships
 7th Memorial Oleg Dyachenko
2007
 1st  Time trial, UEC European Under-23 Road Championships
 8th Coppa San Geo
2008
 8th Overall Giro della Valle d'Aosta
2009
 1st Stage 1b (TTT) Settimana Internazionale di Coppi e Bartali
 2nd Ringerike GP
 3rd Time trial, National Road Championships
2010
 1st Stage 1 (TTT) Brixia Tour
 5th Overall Five Rings of Moscow
 9th Overall Danmark Rundt
2012
 1st  Sprints classification Tour of Turkey
2013
 1st Stage 9 Giro d'Italia
 1st Stage 1b (TTT) Settimana Internazionale di Coppi e Bartali
 1st Stage 3 (TTT) Tour des Fjords
 10th Strade Bianche
2014
 1st  Mountains classification Tour of Austria
2015
 Tour de Romandie
1st  Sprints classification
1st  Mountains classification
2016
 National Road Championships
2nd Road race
3rd Time trial
2017
 2nd Time trial, National Road Championships

Grand Tour general classification results timeline

References

External links
Maxim Belkov profile at 

1985 births
Living people
Russian male cyclists
Sportspeople from Izhevsk
Russian Giro d'Italia stage winners